Bistan or Beistan may refer to:
 Bistan, Chaypareh, West Azerbaijan Province, Iran
 Bistan, Poldasht, West Azerbaijan Province, Iran
 Bistan, a rebel corporal in the 2016 film Rogue One: A Star Wars Story